The Ogre is a river in Latvia that is 188 kilometers long. It is a right tributary of the river Daugava. In 13th century river was called Wogen or Woga.

Etymology 
There are three main versions of the etymology of Ogre's name (both town and river). The first states that the name of the river from which this city derives its name is of Russian origin (угри, ugri, meaning "eels") because there used to be many eels in the river Ogre. A popular folk legend says that Catherine the Great of Russia was the one who gave the river this name because there were a lot of eels in the river; however, this lacks any evidence.
Whereas Estonian linguist Paul Alvre takes into consideration an older form of the Ogre river's name (Wogene, Woga) first found in Livonian Chronicle of Henry (1180–1227), and argues that it cognates with Estonian word voog (with possible meanings: "stream, flow, waves"), therefore showing connection with Finno-Ugric languages, most probably early Livonian language.

A third etymology gives a reconstructed form *Vingrē, related to Lithuanian vingrùs, "meandering, curly" or Latvian vingrs, "nimble;" thus meaning "the meandering river"; the village of Engure has the same root.

See also
List of rivers of Latvia

References

Rivers of Latvia